The 1986 Arizona gubernatorial election took place on November 4, 1986, for the post of Governor of Arizona. Republican Evan Mecham, who defeated Burton Barr for the Republican nomination, defeated the Democratic nominee and State Superintendent Carolyn Warner and independent candidate Bill Schulz. However, Mecham did not complete his full term, as he was impeached and removed from office in 1988. This was the first gubernatorial election in which La Paz County participated after separating from Yuma County in between this election and the one just before it.

Democratic Primary

Candidates
Tony Mason, candidate for U.S. House in 1976
Dave Moss, candidate for Governor in 1978 and 1982
Carolyn Warner, Superintendent of Public Instruction

Declined
Bill Schulz, businessman and Democratic nominee for U.S. Senate in 1980

Results

Source: OurCampaigns.com, AZ Governor - D Primary

Republican Primary

Candidates
Burton Barr, House Majority Leader and State Representative from Phoenix
Evan Mecham, auto dealer and perennial candidate

Results

Source: OurCampaigns.com, AZ Governor - R Primary

General election

Results

References

1986
1986 United States gubernatorial elections
Gubernatorial